The 2016–17 2. Frauen-Bundesliga was the thirteenth season of Germany's second-tier women's football league.

North
The season started on 28 August 2016 and ended on 21 May 2017. Bramfelder SV was promoted from the 2015–16 Regionalliga Nord, 1. FC Union Berlin was promoted from the 2015–16 Regionalliga Nordost and Arminia Bielefeld was promoted from the 2015–16 Regionalliga West.

Results

Top scorers
.

South
The season started on 28 August 2016 and ended on 21 May 2017. SC Sand II was promoted from the 2015–16 Regionalliga Süd.

Results

Top scorers
.

References

2016-17
2